Butyrophilin subfamily 1 member A1 is a protein that in humans is encoded by the BTN1A1 gene.

Butyrophilin (BTN) is the major protein associated with fat droplets in the milk. It is a member of the immunoglobulin superfamily. It may have a cell surface receptor function. The human butyrophilin gene is localized in the major histocompatibility complex (MHC) class I region of 6p and may have arisen relatively recently in evolution by the shuffling of exons between 2 ancestral gene families

Function
Btn1a1 regulates the amount of lipids and size of droplets expressed in milk.  When the gene is compromised in laboratory mice, approximately half the pups died within the first 20 days and the remainder were significantly under-weight.

Link to multiple sclerosis

Butyrophilin has been presented as a potential antigen which may be similar enough to myelin oligodendrocyte glycoprotein (MOG) to spur the immune system to attack myelin in a process known as molecular or epitopic mimicry.  This suggests that ingestion of butyrophilin in dairy products from cows and goats may be a potential trigger for multiple sclerosis. Independent studies by a group in Germany have reached similar conclusions.

The German group have used heavy doses of butyrophilin on mice with an experimental model for multiple sclerosis called EAE. They have found that this strategy, called immune tolerance, reduces the effects of the disease.

References

External links

Further reading